Daunosamine is a deoxy sugar and amino sugar of the hexosamine class.

Daunosamine is a component of the anthracycline class of antineoplastics, linked to a derivative of naphthacene. It is a component of birch juice.

The compound is soluble in water and responds with polymers like cellulose and lignin if it is in excess, so collection of birch juice is very helpful for the birch tree.

The dnrQ gene is required for the synthesis of daunosamine.

References

External links
 

Hexosamines
Deoxy sugars